Zdzisław Karos (died February 23, 1982) was a senior sergeant of Citizens' Militia of People's Republic of Poland who served as a guard to the embassies in Warsaw and is known as the only certain fatal victim of the generally non-violent Solidarity.

On February 23, 1982, Karos was on the way to his workplace.  While in a street car he was attacked by two juveniles, who were trying to disarm him.  In the fight that followed, Karos was fatally shot by 17-year-old Robert Chechłacz.

Both young men who attacked Karos were members of the secret anti-government paramilitary organisation Upspring Home Army - Second Company, led by a Roman Catholic priest Sylwester Zych, named after the Polish Home Army and protesting against martial law.  Robert Chechłacz, was sentenced to 25 years in prison and was pardoned and freed in 1989. Sylwester Zych was convicted of helping the attackers and sentenced to 6 years in prison. He subsequently served the entire term and died in 1989 under unexplained suspicious circumstances.

Zdzisław Karos was survived by two children.

References

Year of birth missing
1982 deaths
Deaths by firearm in Poland
Male murder victims
Polish police officers
People murdered in Poland